The NCHA Derby is the final jewel in the National Cutting Horse Association's Triple Crown; the first being the NCHA World Championship Futurity followed by the NCHA Super Stakes.  The NCHA Derby is open to 4-year-old horses of all breeds, and offers two divisions: the Open and Non-Professional.  The Derby is held as one of the main events during the NCHA Summer Spectacular at Will Rogers Memorial Coliseum in Fort Worth, Texas.

References

External links
National Cutting Horse Association (U.S.)

National Cutting Horse Association